The semispinalis muscles are a group of three muscles belonging to the transversospinales. These are the semispinalis capitis, the semispinalis cervicis and the semispinalis thoracis.

The semispinalis capitis (complexus) is situated at the upper and back part of the neck, deep to the splenius, and medial to the longissimus cervicis and longissimus capitis. It arises by a series of tendons from the tips of the transverse processes of the upper six or seven thoracic and the seventh cervical vertebrae, and from the articular processes of the three cervical vertebrae above this (C4-C6).

The tendons, uniting, form a broad muscle, which passes upward, and is inserted between the superior and inferior nuchal lines of the occipital bone. It lies deep to the trapezius muscle and can be palpated as a firm round muscle mass just lateral to the cervical spinous processes.

The semispinalis cervicis (or semispinalis colli), arises by a series of tendinous and fleshy fibers from the transverse processes of the upper five or six thoracic vertebrae, and is inserted into the cervical spinous processes, from the axis to the fifth cervical vertebrae inclusive. The semispinalis cervicis is thicker than the semispinalis thoracis. The fasciculus connected with the axis is the largest, and is chiefly muscular in structure.

The semispinalis thoracis (or semispinalis dorsi) muscle consists of thin, narrow, fleshy fasciculi, interposed between tendons of considerable length. It arises by a series of small tendons from the transverse processes of the sixth to the tenth thoracic vertebrae, and is inserted, by tendons, into the spinous processes of the upper four thoracic and lower two cervical vertebrae.

The semispinalis muscles are innervated by the dorsal rami of the cervical spinal nerves.

See also
 List of muscles of the human body

Additional images

References

External links
 
 
 
 
 
 Image at ithaca.edu
 
 

Muscles of the torso